Torokul Dzhanuzakov (1893–1921) was a Kyrgyz Soviet politician; the deputy chairman of the Central Executive Committee of the Turkestan Autonomous Soviet Socialist Republic, chairman of the Commission for Refugees in 1916, one of the main organizers and leaders of the pan-Turk movement in Turkestan, and a member of the secret Turkestan National Union (TMB) political organization.

Early life
Dzhanuzakov and the outstanding statesman of Turkestan Turar Ryskulov were friends since childhood. Together they graduated from the Merke boarding school in 1909. As the best graduate, Torokul was accepted as an interpreter by the administration to the Governor-General of Turkestan.

Referring to extracts from the diaries of Dmitry Furmanov, Dzhanuzakov actively participated in the uprising of 16th year and was one of its leaders.

During Soviet times Dzhanuzakov was the initiator of the creation and chairman of the Commission for Refugees, participants of the uprising in 1916. He managed to free the local population, who suffered from the punitive operations of the tsarist regime, from taxes, to allocate huge sums of money and other means of material assistance to the population of Turkestan. Using the powers that he has, Dzhanuzakov simultaneously organizes work to investigate the most violent manifestations of the great-power attitude of the kulak population of the Chuy and Issyk-Kul valleys towards the local Kyrgyz. Thus, as a result of the investigation of the brutal murder in 1916, 537 unarmed Kyrgyz people – old men, women and children in the vicinity of the village of Belovodskoye, were sentenced to be executed by the organizers of this crime. Thanks to Dzhanuzakov's determination to implement the measures taken by the authorities to assist refugees returning from China, they immediately returned to their former owners the land occupied during and immediately after the uprising. But later, his concerns about improving the situation of his countrymen were interpreted as "distortions of land policy".

Career
Between the military and political leadership of the Turkestan ASSR, there were contradictions on many issues. Especially for the first two years of the Basmachi movement there was no agreement. Political leadership allowed the criticism of the military for errors and surpluses in the fight against Basmachism in Turkestan. They consisted in a resolute resolution of the struggle against the Basmachi movement, numerous facts of arbitrariness and violence, Red Terror against ordinary people.

He attended the Congress of the Peoples of the East held in Baku in September 1920, where he had the floor and became involved in drawing up the statutes of ERK, a Muslim Socialist organisation.

At the Samarkand Turkestan National Union Congress sessions held 5–7 September, the by-laws of the society, consisting of twenty-four items, and the flag of Turkistan were approved. In the committee preparing the national flag of Turkestan, Dzhanuzakov served along with Munevver Kari and Zeki Velidi Togan and a few other individuals.

In parallel with participation in the national liberation movement, Torokul Dzhanuzakov engaged in scientific research: he collected folklore, conducted archaeographical and ethnographic researches.

Death
Dzhanuzakov was shot by the Cheka authorities in 1921 when he was 28 years old.

Report of the Cheka Plenipotentiary Representative in Turkestan Republic Yakov Peters to the Presidium of the Cheka of 17 November 1921:

See also
List of unsolved murders

References

Books

1893 births
1921 deaths
Jadids
Kazakhstani politicians
Kyrgyzstani politicians
Male murder victims
Pan-Turkists
Soviet politicians
Tajikistani politicians
Unsolved murders in the Soviet Union
Uzbekistani politicians